Habartice may refer to: 

Habartice, a village in the Liberec District
Habartice, a village in the Šumperk District